The Battle of Frenchman's Run is a 1915 American comedy film featuring Harry Carey.

Cast
 Harry Carey
 George Cooper
 Frank Currier
 J. Herbert Frank
 Dorothy Kelly
 Albert Roccardi
 Charles Wellesley
 Charles West (as Charles H. West)

See also
 List of American films of 1915
 Harry Carey filmography

External links

1915 films
1915 short films
American black-and-white films
Films directed by Theodore Marston
American silent short films
1915 comedy films
Silent American comedy films
American comedy short films
1910s American films